Ben Lloyd is an English musician, record producer and recording engineer based in Oxford, England. He currently plays electric guitar in Frank Turner's band, The Sleeping Souls, and is a member of the British rock band, Dive Dive. He also recorded and produced Frank Turner's first EP Campfire Punkrock (2006) and his first two albums Sleep Is for the Week (2007) and Love Ire & Song (2008). He is endorsed by Laney Amplification and Ernie Ball Strings. Frank Turner and The Sleeping Souls headlined Wembley Arena in April 2012, and played at the Opening Ceremony of the 2012 Olympic Games in London.

Discography

As musician

Studio albums
 Tilting at Windmills (2005) Dive Dive
 Revenge of the Mechanical Dog (2007) Dive Dive
 Sleep Is for the Week (2007) Frank Turner
 Love Ire & Song (2008) Frank Turner
 Poetry of the Deed (2009) Frank Turner
 Potential (2011) Dive Dive
 England Keep My Bones (2011) Frank Turner
 Tape Deck Heart (2013) Frank Turner
 Positive Songs for Negative People (2015) Frank Turner
 Be More Kind (2018) Frank Turner

EPs
 Campfire Punkrock (2006) Frank Turner
 iTunes Festival: London 2010 (2010) Frank Turner
 Rock & Roll (2010) Frank Turner

As producer

Studio albums
 Revenge of the Mechanical Dog (2007) Dive Dive
 Sleep Is for the Week (2007) Frank Turner
 Love Ire & Song (2008) Frank Turner
  One Light is Gone (2010) Josienne Clarke
 Potential'' (2011) Dive Dive

References

Living people
musicians from Oxford
English rock guitarists
English male guitarists
Year of birth missing (living people)